Serbia–Syria relations are foreign relations between the Republic of Serbia and the Syrian Arab Republic. Serbia has an embassy in Damascus. Syria has an embassy in Belgrade. Syria is also a member of the Non-Aligned Movement, while Serbia is an observer.

Serbian citizens in Syria 
Serbs living in Syria are for the most part women married to Syrians, and the Foreign Ministry in Belgrade puts their number in the hundreds. Some of the marriages are the legacy of close political and economic ties formed in the communist era between the Arab world and communist countries like Yugoslavia.

Syrian citizens in Serbia 

By the first half of 2013, 432 citizens of Syria had requested asylum in Serbia.

See also 
 Foreign relations of Serbia
 Foreign relations of Syria
 Yugoslavia and the Non-Aligned Movement

References

External links 
 Serbian Ministry of Foreign Affairs about relations with Syria
 Embassy of Serbia in Syria
 Embassy of Syria in Serbia

 
Syria
Bilateral relations of Syria